Cao Yongjing (Chinese: 曹永竞; born 15 February 1997 in Chongqing) is a Chinese footballer who currently plays for Chinese Super League side Beijing Guoan.

Club career
Cao Yongjing was promoted to Chinese Super League side Guizhou Renhe's first team squad in 2015. On 14 March 2015, he made his Super League debut in the season's second match which Guizhou Renhe lost to Jiangsu Sainty 2–0, coming on as a substitute for Magnus Eriksson in the 76th minute. Unfortunately he would be part of the team that was relegated at the end of the 2015 Chinese Super League season. He would remain loyal towards the club as they moved locations, renamed themselves Beijing Renhe and gained promotion back into the top tier at the end of the 2016 league season. At the end of the 2019 Chinese Super League he would experience another relegation with the club.

He joined City rivals Beijing Guoan who announced the signing of Cao Yongjing on 9 February 2021 and was given the number 37 shirt at the club. He would make his debut in a league game against Shanghai Shenhua on 24 April 2021 that ended in a 2-1 defeat. This would be followed by his first goal for the club in a league game against Shenzhen F.C. on 4 January 2022 in a 1-0 victory.

Career statistics 
Statistics accurate as of match played 31 January 2023.

References

External links
 

1997 births
Living people
Chinese footballers
Footballers from Chongqing
Beijing Renhe F.C. players
Beijing Guoan F.C. players
Chinese Super League players
China League One players
Association football midfielders
Footballers at the 2018 Asian Games
Asian Games competitors for China
21st-century Chinese people